Malloderma pascoei is a species of beetle in the family Cerambycidae. It was described by Lacordaire in 1872. It is known from Laos, Bhutan, China, and Vietnam. It contains the varietas Malloderma pascoei var. tonkinea.

References

Saperdini
Beetles described in 1872